United Nations Security Council Resolution 416, adopted on October 21, 1977, considered a report by the Secretary-General regarding the United Nations Disengagement Observer Force and noted the discussions the Secretary-General had with all the concerned parties to the Middle East situation.  The council expressed its concern over the continuing tension in the area and decided to:

(a) To renew the mandate of the United Nations Disengagement Observer Force for another year, until October 24, 1978;
(b) To request the Secretary-General to keep the Security Council informed on further developments;
(c) To call upon all parties to immediately implement resolution 338 (1973).

The resolution was adopted by 13 votes to none; China and Libya did not participate in the vote.

See also
 Arab–Israeli conflict
 Egypt–Israel relations
 List of United Nations Security Council Resolutions 401 to 500 (1976–1982)

References
Text of the Resolution at undocs.org

External links
 

 0416
 0416
Middle East peace efforts
 0416
October 1977 events